The pelvic cavity is a body cavity that is bounded by the bones of the pelvis. Its oblique roof is the pelvic inlet (the superior opening of the pelvis). Its lower boundary is the pelvic floor.

The pelvic cavity primarily contains the reproductive organs, urinary bladder, distal ureters, proximal urethra, terminal sigmoid colon, rectum, and anal canal. In females, the uterus, Fallopian tubes, ovaries and upper vagina occupy the area between the other viscera.

The rectum is located at the back of the pelvis, in the curve of the sacrum and coccyx; the bladder is in front, behind the pubic symphysis. The pelvic cavity also contains major arteries, veins, muscles, and nerves. These structures coexist in a crowded space, and disorders of one pelvic component may impact upon another; for example, constipation may overload the rectum and compress the urinary bladder, or childbirth might damage the pudendal nerves and later lead to anal weakness.

Structure 

The pelvis has an anteroinferior, a posterior, and two lateral pelvic walls; and an inferior pelvic wall, also called the pelvic floor. The parietal peritoneum is attached here and to the abdominal wall.

Lesser pelvis 
The lesser pelvis (or "true pelvis") is the space enclosed by the pelvic girdle and below the pelvic brim: between the pelvic inlet and the pelvic floor. This cavity is a short, curved canal, deeper on its posterior than on its anterior wall. Some sources consider this region to be the entirety of the pelvic cavity. Other sources define the pelvic cavity as the larger space including the greater pelvis, just above the pelvic inlet.

The lesser pelvis is bounded in front and below by the superior rami of the symphysis pubis; above and behind, by the sacrum and coccyx; and laterally, by a broad, smooth, quadrangular area of bone, corresponding to the inner surfaces of the body and superior ramus of the ischium, and the part of the ilium below the arcuate line.

The lesser pelvis contains the pelvic colon, rectum, bladder, and some of the sex organs.
The rectum is at the back, in the curve of the sacrum and coccyx; the bladder is in front, behind the pubic symphysis. In females, the uterus and vagina occupy the interval between these viscera.

The pelvic splanchnic nerves arising at S2–S4 are in the lesser pelvis.

Greater pelvis 
The greater pelvis (or false pelvis) is the space enclosed by the pelvic girdle above and in front of the pelvic brim. It is bounded on either side by the ilium. In the front, it is incomplete, presenting a wide interval between the anterior borders of the ilia, which is filled by the muscles and fascia of the anterior abdominal wall; behind is a deep notch on either side between the ilium and the base of the sacrum that is filled by the thoracolumbar fascia and associated muscles.

It is generally considered part of the abdominal cavity (which is why it is sometimes called the false pelvis). Some sources consider this region part of the pelvic cavity, while others reframe the classification by calling the combination the abdominopelvic cavity.

The greater pelvis supports the intestines (specifically, the ileum and sigmoid colon), and transmits part of their weight to the anterior wall of the abdomen.

The femoral nerve from L2–L4 is in the greater pelvis, but not in the lesser pelvis.

Ligaments

Arteries 
 internal iliac artery
 median sacral artery
 ovarian artery

Nerves 
 sacral plexus
 splanchnic nerves
 femoral nerve (greater pelvis)

Measurements 
The pelvis can be classified into four main types by measuring the pelvic diameters and conjugates at the pelvic inlet and outlet and as oblique diameters.

Additional images

References

External links 
 Overview at buffalo.edu
 Diagram at southwest.tn.edu
 Photo of model (female)
  – "The Male Pelvis: Articulated bones of male pelvis"
 

Pelvis